Trafford Park is an area of the Metropolitan Borough of Trafford, Greater Manchester, England, opposite Salford Quays on the southern side of the Manchester Ship Canal,  southwest of Manchester city centre and  north of Stretford. Until the late 19th century, it was the ancestral home of the Trafford family, who sold it to financier Ernest Terah Hooley in 1896.

Trafford Park is almost entirely surrounded by water; the Bridgewater Canal forms its southeastern and southwestern boundaries, and the Manchester Ship Canal, which opened in 1894, its northeastern and northwestern. Hooley's plan was to develop the Ship Canal frontage, but the canal was slow to generate the predicted volume of traffic, so in the early days the park was largely used for leisure activities such as golf, polo and boating. 

British Westinghouse was the first major company to move in, and by 1903 it was employing about half of the 12,000 workers then employed in the park, which became one of the most important engineering facilities in Britain.

Trafford Park was a major supplier of materiel in the First and Second World Wars, producing the Rolls-Royce Merlin engines used to power both the Spitfire and the Lancaster. At its peak in 1945, an estimated 75,000 workers were employed in the park. Employment began to decline in the 1960s as companies closed in favour of newer, more efficient plants elsewhere. By 1967 employment had fallen to 50,000, and the decline continued throughout the 1970s, when difficult economic conditions were pushing up unemployment nationally.

The new generation of container ships was too large for the Manchester Ship Canal, which led to a further decline in Trafford Park's fortunes. The workforce had fallen to 15,000 by 1976, and by the 1980s - in the wake of another recession - industry had virtually disappeared from the park.

The Trafford Park Urban Development Corporation, formed in 1987, reversed the estate's decline. In the 11 years of its existence, the park attracted 1,000 companies, generating 28,299 new jobs and £1.759 billion of private-sector investment. As of 2008, there were 1,400 companies within Trafford Park, employing an estimated 35,000 people. Despite a decline in these numbers soon afterwards due to a fresh recession, the area was recovering well a decade later with economic growth re-established and unemployment reduced.

History

Pre-industrial
Until the industrial development of the park began in the late 19th century, much of the area now known as Trafford Park was a "beautifully timbered deer park".  Its  comprised flat meadows and grassland, and an inner park containing a tree-lined avenue leading from an entrance lodge at Barton-upon-Irwell.  It was the ancestral estate of the de Trafford family, one of the most ancient in England, and then one of the largest landowners in Stretford.  The family acquired the lands around Trafford in about 1200, when Richard de Trafford was given the lordship of Stretford by Hamon de Massey, 4th Baron of Dunham.  Some time between 1672 and 1720, the de Traffords moved from the home they had occupied since 1017, in what is now known as Old Trafford, to what was then called Whittleswick Hall, which they renamed Trafford Hall. Their new home was a little to the east of where Tenax Circle is today, at the northwestern end of Trafford Park Road.

Trafford Park contained the hall, its grounds, and three farms: Park Farm, Moss Farm, and Waters Meeting Farm. From the original three entrance lodges to the park, at Throstle Nest, Barton-upon-Irwell and Old Trafford, only the latter has survived, having been relocated from its original position opposite what is today the White City retail park to become the entrance to Gorse Hill Park.

In 1761, a section of the Bridgewater Canal was built along the southeast and southwest sides of Trafford Park. The canal along with the River Irwell, which marked the estate's northeast and northwest boundaries, gave the park its present-day "island-like" quality. In about 1860, an  ornamental lake was dug in the north of the park, close to the River Irwell.

A meeting held in 1882 at the Didsbury home of engineer Daniel Adamson began the estate's transformation, with the creation of the Manchester Ship Canal committee. Sir Humphrey de Trafford was an implacable opponent of the proposed canal, objecting that, amongst other things, it would bring polluted water close to his residence, interfere with his drainage, and render Trafford Hall uninhabitable, forcing him to "give up his home and leave the place". Despite Sir Humphrey's opposition the Ship Canal Bill became law on its third passage through Parliament, on 6 August 1885. Construction began in 1888, more than two years after Sir Humphrey's death, although a  wall was built between the canal and the park, so as to block it off from view. Two wharves were also built, for the exclusive use of the de Traffords.

The opening of the ship canal in 1894 made Trafford Park a prime site for industrial development. During the following century, the park was built over with factories and some housing for workers. The deer were initially allowed to continue roaming free, but as the park's industrialisation gathered pace they were considered inappropriate and were killed, the last of them in 1900. Trafford Hall survived until its demolition following the Second World War.

Early development
On 7 May 1896, Sir Humphrey Francis de Trafford put the  estate up for auction, but it failed to reach its reported reserve price of £300,000 (£ as of ). There was much public debate, before and after the abortive sale, as to whether Manchester Corporation ought to buy Trafford Park, but the corporation could not agree terms quickly enough, and so on 23 June Ernest Terah Hooley became the new owner of Trafford Park, for the sum of £360,000 (£ as of ).

On 17 August, Hooley formed Trafford Park Estates Ltd, transferring his ownership of the park to the new company – of which he was the chairman and a significant shareholder – at a substantial profit. The initial plans for the estate included a racetrack, exclusive housing and a cycle works, along with the development of the ship canal frontage for "all types of trade including timber". By that time the ship canal had been open for two years, but the predicted traffic had yet to materialise. Hooley met with Marshall Stevens, the general manager of the Ship Canal Company, and both men recognised the benefit that the industrial development of Trafford Park could offer to the ship canal, and the ship canal to the estate. In January 1897 Stevens became the managing director of Trafford Park Estates. He remained with the company, latterly as its joint chairman and managing director, until 1930.

The company initially chose not to construct buildings for letting, and instead leased land for development. But by the end of June 1897 less than one per cent of the park had been leased, and so the park's existing assets were put to use until more tenants could be found. Trafford Hall was opened as a hotel in 1899, to serve prospective industrialists considering a move to the park, along with their key employees. It had 40 bedrooms, available to "Gentlemen only". The hall's stables and some other outbuildings were used for stock auctions and the sale of horses, from 1900 to 1902, and the ornamental lake was leased to William Crooke and Sons, for use as a boating lake, initially on a five-year lease. The club moved from Trafford Park to a new site at Hopwood Park in 1912. All of the open-field land uses were subsequently pushed out by industry.

A series of 19 were built initially, available to rent at £80 per annum (£ as of ). Brooke Bond was one of the companies that took advantage of the Hives, before moving to its purpose-built factory on the park in 1922. The Estates Company also built large reinforced concrete warehouses, known as Safes. These buildings were fitted with sprinkler systems and were considered fireproof, which reduced insurance costs to 25 per cent of those of comparable warehouses elsewhere in the area.

Industrialisation
Among the first industries to arrive was the Manchester Patent Fuel Company, in 1898. The Trafford Brick Company arrived soon after, followed by J.W. Southern & Co. (timber merchants), James Gresham (engineers), and W. T. Glovers & Co. (electric cable manufacturers). Glovers also built a power station in the park, on the banks of the Bridgewater Canal. Most of these early developments were built on the eastern side of the park, while the rest of it remained largely undeveloped.

The first American company to arrive was Westinghouse Electric, which formed its British subsidiary – British Westinghouse Electric Company – in 1899, and purchased  on two sites. Building work started in 1900, and the factory began production of turbines and electric generators in 1902. By the following year, British Westinghouse was employing about half of the 12,000 workers in Trafford Park. In 1919, Westinghouse was sold to the Vickers Company and renamed Metropolitan-Vickers, often shortened to Metrovicks.

In 1903, the Cooperative Wholesale Society (CWS), bought land at Trafford Wharf and set up a large food-packing factory and a flour mill. Other companies arriving at about the same time included Kilverts (lard manufacturers), the Liverpool Warehousing Company, and Lancashire Dynamo & Crypto Ltd.

The second major American company to set up a manufacturing base in Trafford Park was the Ford Motor Company, in 1911. Initially Ford used its factory as an assembly plant for the Model T, although other vehicles were assembled there in later years, before moving to a new factory at Dagenham, Essex, in 1931. By 1915, 100 American companies had moved into the park, peaking at more than 200 by 1933. When the cotton industry began to decline in the early 20th century, Trafford Park and the Manchester Ship Canal helped Manchester – and to a lesser extent the rest of south Lancashire – to weather the economic depression from which the rest of Lancashire suffered. During the First World War the park was used for the manufacture of munitions, chemicals and other materiel. Most firms at Trafford Park succeeded in avoiding bankruptcy during the Great Depression, unlike the rest of Lancashire. Ford moved to Dagenham in 1931, but returned temporarily to Trafford Park during the Second World War.

Following the lead of its American counterpart, Metropolitan Vickers set up Manchester's and one of the UK's first radio stations at their factory in 1921. The station's first broadcast took place on 17 May 1922. In October that year the company was one of six who formed the British Broadcasting Company (BBC), which started broadcasting from the Metrovicks studio under the call sign 2ZY on 15 November 1922. Much of the station's content was musical, but news, plays, and children's programmes were also transmitted. Conditions in the small  studio were cramped, and the BBC moved the station to larger premises outside the park in 1923.

Westwards expansion
Sir Humphrey de Trafford had retained  of land on the western side of the ship canal after his 1897 sale of Trafford Park. Hemmed in as it was between the canals and "an increasingly urbanised Stretford to the east", as the industrialisation of the park neared its completion the Estates Company started to acquire parcels of the remaining de Trafford land, then in the control of family trustees, as did the Canal Company. In 1924 the Estates Company bought a half share in Dumplington Estates Ltd., a company set up to administer  of land bought from the de Trafford Trustees on which it was intended to build a garden village. In 1929 the Ship Canal Company acquired Dumplington Estates, and in return gave the Estates Company land to the south of Barton, the Trafford Park Extension. The Canal Company recognised the potential for a new dock on the land, giving the area its name of Barton Dock Estate, although no dock was ever built. The Barton Docks area was developed during and after the Second World War, but the land belonging to Dumplington Estates remained largely undeveloped until the construction of the Trafford Centre, which opened in 1998.

Second World War
Trafford Park was largely turned over to the production of war materiel during the Second World War, such as the Avro Manchester and Avro Lancaster heavy bombers, and the Rolls-Royce Merlin engines used to power the Spitfire, Hurricane, Mosquito and the Lancaster. The engines were made by Ford, under licence. The 17,316 workers employed in Ford's purpose-built factory had produced 34,000 engines by the war's end. The facility was designed in two separate sections to minimise the impact of bomb damage on production. The wood-working factory of F. Hills & Sons built more than 800 Percival Proctor aircraft for the RAF between 1940 and 1945, which were flight tested at the nearby Barton Aerodrome. Other companies produced gun bearings, steel tracks for Churchill tanks, munitions, Bailey bridges, and much else. ICI built and operated the first facility in the UK able to produce penicillin in quantity.

As an important industrial area, Trafford Park was frequently bombed by the Luftwaffe, particularly during the Manchester Blitz of December 1940. On the night of 23 December 1940, the Metropolitan-Vickers aircraft factory in Mosley Road was badly damaged, with the loss of the first 13 MV-built Avro Manchester bombers in final assembly. The new Ford factory producing aircraft engines was bombed only a few days after its opening in May 1941. Trafford Hall was severely damaged by bombing, and was demolished shortly after the war ended.

In the December 1940 air raids, stray bombs aiming for Trafford Park landed on the nearby Old Trafford football stadium, home of Manchester United, but this air raid only resulted in minor damage and matches were soon being played at the stadium again. On 11 March 1941, stray bombs fell onto Old Trafford for a second time, causing serious damage to the stadium. It was comprehensively rebuilt after the war and re-opened in 1949, until which time Manchester United played their home games at Maine Road, home of Manchester City in Moss Side.

At the outbreak of war in 1939 there were an estimated 50,000 people employed at Trafford Park. By the end of the war in 1945 that number had risen to 75,000, probably the peak size of the park's workforce; Metropolitan-Vickers alone employed 26,000.

Decline and regeneration

In the 1960s employment in the park began to decline as companies closed their premises in favour of newer, more efficient plants elsewhere. Ellesmere Port and Runcorn at the western end of the Manchester Ship Canal were in the ascendency industrially and they overtook Trafford Park in economic importance. In 1967, employment had fallen to 50,000 and there was a further decline in the 1970s. In 1971, Stretford Council responded by setting up the Trafford Park Industrial Council (TRAFIC), membership of which was open to any firm in Trafford Park. One of TRAFIC's early initiatives was to encourage businesses in the park to address the general air of decay, by improving their own areas through landscaping and other environmental improvements. The park's decline was exacerbated by the decreasing use of the Manchester Ship Canal during the 1970s, which was unable to accommodate the newer, larger container ships then entering service. By 1976, the workforce had fallen to 15,000, and by the 1980s industry had virtually disappeared.

On 12 August 1981,  of Trafford Park – along with Salford Quays – were declared an Enterprise Zone by the UK government, in an attempt to encourage new development within the estate. The new status did little to reverse the park's fortunes however; during a 1984 House of Commons debate, Member of Parliament for Stretford, Tony Lloyd, described the area's decline as "spectacular and disastrous". The target had been to create 7,000 new jobs over 10 years, but by 1986 only 2,557 had been created, not even enough to compensate for the ongoing job losses caused by closures within the park. On 10 February 1987 the Trafford Park Development Corporation was formed to assume responsibility for a  Urban Development Area that included not only Trafford Park but also parts of Stretford, Salford Quays, and the former steelworks at Irlam, now known as Northbank. Of the four redevelopment schemes undertaken by the corporation one, Wharfside, included  of the eastern end of the park as well as part of the ship canal docks and the area around Manchester United F.C.'s Old Trafford football ground to the east of the Bridgewater Canal. The intention was to build "a flagship site" containing prestigious accommodation for offices, shops, and "hi-tech" industries, capitalising on the area's proximity to Manchester city centre and mirroring the earlier success of the redevelopment at nearby Salford Quays.

Between 1987 and 1998, the development corporation attracted 1,000 companies, generating 28,299 new jobs and £1.759 billion of private sector investment. The setting up of the corporation was intended to be only a temporary measure, terminating on 31 March 1997, but it was extended for a further year until March 1998 when responsibility for Trafford Park's development passed to Trafford Council. The park is once again a major centre of employment in Trafford, and its regeneration has led to a high start-up rate for businesses and low rates of unemployment in the area. As of 2008, there were 1,400 companies within the park employing an estimated 35,000 people.

Governance

Civic history
The eastern area of the park, where the first developments took place at the end of the 19th century, was then under the local government control of Stretford Urban District; the west was controlled by the urban district of Barton-upon-Irwell. Tensions soon began to emerge between the Estates Company and Stretford Council over the provision of local services and infrastructure. In 1902, W. T. Glover & Co, a cable manufacturing company that had moved to the park from nearby Salford, built a power station next to their works to supply electricity to the rest of the park; the Estates Company had previously approached Manchester Corporation, but Stretford would not allow another local authority to supply electricity within its area.

In 1901 Manchester Corporation formally proposed a merger with Stretford UDC, on the basis that Stretford's growth was due in large part to Trafford Park, the growth of which in turn was largely due to the Manchester Ship Canal. Manchester Corporation had provided one-third of the capital needed to build the ship canal, for which it had doubled its municipal debt, despite having also increased rates by 26 per cent between 1892 and 1895. Stretford and Lancashire County Council opposed the merger, which was rejected following a government inquiry. In 1969 Pevsner wrote: "That [neighbouring] Stretford and Salford are not administratively one with Manchester is one of the most curious anomalies of England."

The tensions between Stretford and the Estates Company began to come to a head in 1906, when in response to complaints in the press about the state of one particular road in the park, Trafford Park Road, Stretford issued formal notices demanding that all premises with frontage onto the road pay for its improvement. Further disputes over the standard of roads in the park followed until, in 1907, the Estates Company presented a petition to Lancashire County Council demanding that Trafford Park should be an urban district in its own right, independent of Stretford. The county council dismissed the petition, but later that year, following a petition organised by the Trafford Park Ratepayers Association, a new local government ward, Park Ward, was created within Stretford. The new ward did not include the western part of the park however, which remained under the control of Barton-upon-Irwell.

As a result of the Local Government Act 1972, the borough of Stretford was abolished and Trafford Park has, since 1 April 1974, formed part of the Metropolitan Borough of Trafford. As of 2010, most of the park is in Stretford, in the Gorse Hill ward of Trafford,  while Dumplington is in the Davyhulme East ward and forms the northern tip of Urmston.

Political representation
Since 1997, Trafford Park has been in the constituency of Stretford and Urmston. In the latest general election, incumbent Labour MP Kate Green was re-elected with a 60.3% share of the vote. In 2022, Green resigned after being nominated deputy mayor of Greater Manchester; her successor was Andrew Western, who won the by-election with a majority of 9,906, representing a swing of 11% from the Conservatives.

Geography
The local bedrock is Triassic Bunter Sandstone, overlaid by sand and gravel deposited during the last ice age, around 10,000 years ago. There are some areas of peat bog in the west of the park, in the area formerly known as Trafford Moss. In 1793, William Roscoe began work on reclaiming the bog, and by 1798 that work was sufficiently advanced for him to turn his attention to the task of reclaiming the much larger Chat Moss in nearby Salford, also owned by the Trafford family.

The Bridgewater Canal forms its southeastern and southwestern boundaries, and the Manchester Ship Canal forms its northeastern and northwestern boundaries. Trafford Park is the most northerly area of Trafford, and faces Salford across the Manchester Ship Canal. Stretford lies to the south and east, and Urmston to the west.

Trafford Park Village

In 1898, a large plot of land was sold to Edmund Nuttall & Co. for the construction of 1,200 houses. The houses were never built, but the land later became the site of Trafford Park Village, known locally as The Village. The announced arrival of the Westinghouse factory acted a spur to development, and in 1899, Trafford Park Dwellings Ltd was formed, with the aim of providing housing for the anticipated influx of new workers. Nuttall's land was acquired, and by 1903 more than 500 houses had been built, rising to over 700 when the development was completed in 1904. In 1907 it was estimated that the population of the Village was 3,060. The development was laid out in a grid pattern, with the roads numbered instead of being named. Avenues numbered 1 to 4 run north–south, streets numbered 1 to 12 run east–west.

The Village was almost completely self-contained, with its own shops, public hall, post office, police station, school, social club, and sports facilities. Three corrugated iron churches were built: a Methodist chapel in 1901, St Cuthberts (Church of England) in 1902, and the Roman Catholic St Antony's in 1904. St Cuthbert's was subsequently replaced by a brick building, but closed in 1982. Only St Antony's remains open; it contains the altar and a stained glass window from the chapel at Trafford Hall, donated by Lady Annette de Trafford. The Village's design attracted criticism from the start; the streets were narrow, with few gardens, and the whole development was close to the pollution of the neighbouring industries. In that respect it resembled the terraced properties in the surrounding areas, many of which were condemned as slums in later years. By the 1970s The Village was also considered by Stretford Council to be a slum area, and unsuitable for residential housing. In the first phase of clearance, during the mid-1970s, 298 houses were demolished. A further 325 houses were demolished in the early 1980s, leaving only the largest 84 houses remaining.

Landmarks

The Imperial War Museum North, opened on 5 July 2002, is in Trafford Wharf, on the southern edge of the ship canal looking over towards Salford Quays. An example of deconstructivist architecture, it was the first building in the United Kingdom to be designed by Daniel Libeskind. The structure consists of three interlocking sections: the air shard, the earth shard, and the water shard, representing a world torn apart by conflict. The museum houses two extensive exhibition spaces. The largest is dedicated to the permanent exhibition covering conflicts from 1900 to the present day, and the other space is used for special exhibitions.

Trafford Ecology Park

The  Trafford Ecology Park is what remains of Trafford Park's ornamental boating lake. Boating continued on the lake until the 1930s, but by then its water had become polluted by asbestos and oil seepage from the neighbouring Anglo American Oil depot. During the Second World War the site was used as a tip for foundry waste. Esso bought the land in 1974, and levelled and partly seeded it, to improve the frontage to its own site. Trafford council bought the land from Esso in 1983, for £50,000 (£ as of ). Government spending restrictions delayed the park's restoration and conversion, and it was not fully opened to the public until 1990.

The present lake is about one-third of its original size, but although now relatively small it supports a wide variety of wildlife, including foxes, weasels, rabbits, hedgehogs, lapwings, kestrels, herons, coot, Canada Geese, and several varieties of newt. In 2007 the park was designated a Local Nature Reserve, one of only two in Trafford.

The site was originally part of the de Trafford family estate, but was enveloped by encroaching industry in the early 1900s. In the following years the area was used as a tipping site by industry and partly filled with construction rubble and slag from steel works. Now owned and managed by Groundwork Manchester, Salford, Stockport, Tameside & Trafford, the park is used as a training centre for horticulture training and as a volunteering hub.

Transport
At the end of the 19th century there were no public transport routes in, and few running close to, Trafford Park. Its size meant that the Estates Company was obliged to provide some means of travelling around the park, and therefore a gas-powered tramway was commissioned, intended to carry both people and freight. The first tram ran on 23 July 1897, but after a few days of operation there was an accident in which a tramcar was derailed, and the service was suspended until the following year. The service was operated by the British Gas Traction Company, which paid a share of its takings to the Estates Company, but by 1899 the company was in serious financial difficulty, and entered voluntary liquidation. Salford Corporation then refused to provide any more gas for the trams, and the service was once again suspended until the Estates Company bought the entire operation for £2,000 in 1900. A separate electric tramway was installed in 1903, and was taken over and operated by Manchester and Salford Corporations in 1905. The gas trams continued to run until 1908, when they were replaced by steam locomotives. Between 1904 and 1907 the Estates Company also operated a horse-drawn bus for the use of gentlemen staying at Trafford Hall, then a hotel. The service, available 24 hours a day, was replaced by a motor car in 1907.

Under an 1898 agreement between the Estates Company and the Ship Canal Company, the latter committed to carry freight on their dock railway between the docks and the park and to the construction of a permanent connection between the two railway networks. The West Manchester Light Railway Company was set up the following year to take over the operations of the tramway and to lay additional track. In 1904 responsibility for all of the parks roads and railways passed to the Trafford Park Company, as a result of the Trafford Park Act of that year. The railway network could subsequently be extended as required, without the need to seek additional permissions from Parliament. The network was also connected to the Manchester, South Junction and Altrincham Railway near Cornbrook. At its peak, the estate's railway network covered 26 route miles (42 km), handling about 2.5 million tons of cargo in 1940. Like the rest of the park, it fell into decline during the 1960s, exacerbated by the increasing use of road transport, and it was closed in 1998, although a lot of infrastructure remains including a lengthy stretch of disused track.

Trafford Park Aerodrome was Manchester's first purpose-built airfield, laid out on a site between Trafford Park Road, Mosley Road, and Ashburton Road. The first aircraft landed there on 7 July 1911, flown from Liverpool by Henry G. Melly. The aerodrome was in use until the early years of the First World War, and possibly until 1918, when it was replaced by the newly completed Alexandra Park Aerodrome.

Current and future transport

Road signs within Trafford Park refer to the subdivisions of Ashburton, Dumplington, Mossfield, Mosley and Newbridge.

The Trafford Park Euroterminal rail freight terminal, which has the capacity to deal with 100,000 containers a year, was opened in 1993, at a cost of £11 million.

Today, Trafford Park is served by a number of bus routes. Bus 248 runs between Trafford Park and Partington. Bus 250 and X50 runs between Manchester city centre and the Trafford Centre. Trafford Park railway station is to the east of the area and is served by trains between Liverpool Lime Street and Manchester Oxford Road.

Manchester Metrolink's Trafford Park Line from Pomona to Trafford Centre opened in March 2020.

References
Notes

Citations

Bibliography

External links

 Trafford Park – The Early Years
 Trafford Hall about 1896
 Trafford Park Railway today

Geography of Trafford
Areas of Greater Manchester
Industrial parks in the United Kingdom